Saint-Jacques-de-Leeds is a municipality located in the Municipalité régionale de comté des Appalaches in Quebec, Canada. It is part of the Chaudière-Appalaches region and the population is 711 as of 2021. It is named after one of Jesus' apostles, James, son of Zebedee, and the city of Leeds, England.

Sister city
 Barmainville, France

References

External links

Commission de toponymie du Québec
Ministère des Affaires municipales, des Régions et de l'Occupation du territoire

Municipalities in Quebec
Incorporated places in Chaudière-Appalaches